Scopula semitata is a moth of the family Geometridae. It was described by Prout in 1913. It is found in the Levant.

Subspecies
Scopula semitata semitata
Scopula semitata ariana (Ebert, 1965)
Scopula semitata taurica (Wehrli, 1930)

Taxonomy
The species is listed as a synonym or subspecies of S. sacraria by some authors.

References

Moths described in 1913
semitata
Taxa named by Louis Beethoven Prout
Moths of the Middle East